Lee Kok Cheong (1939 – 14 December 1993) was the Singaporean Head of the English Proficiency Unit at the National University of Singapore. He was murdered on 14 December 1993; the identities of his killers remained unknown to Singapore police for more than two years. In 1998, Too Yin Sheong (alias "Nelson"), one of the men accused of the murder, was convicted of murder and sentenced to death. Another two accomplices were caught in 1998 and 2005 respectively, and one ended up in jail for robbery while the other was condemned to hang for the crime.

Murder and outcome
According to the statement of Too at his trial, he had met Professor Lee at a coffeeshop named Irene's Coffee in Ang Mo Kio; soon after that, the professor gave Too his telephone number and invited Too to visit his home. When Too did visit, the professor made overtures to have sexual intercourse with him, which he declined. Before leaving, Too noticed that the Professor had valuable antiques in his home.

When Too mentioned this incident to two friends—Ng Chek Siong (alias "Koo Neng") and Lee Chez Kee (alias "Kim Beh"), Lee suggested robbing the professor. He also suggested that Too arrange a meeting on the pretext of introducing Lee to the professor, so that the group could gain entry to Professor Lee's house.

On December 12, 1993, the three went to Professor Lee's house in a car with Ng as the driver. Too and Lee entered the house, where they tied the Professor up, then stabbed and strangled him to death. They ransacked his house and stole his ATM card, which Too later used to withdraw money from the Professor's bank account. The Professor had lived alone, and his body was found in his house in Tai Man only two days later in a partly decomposed state.

For a long time, his killers remained at large. Only an anonymous tip-off, two years after the murder, enabled police to make progress in solving the case. Too Yin Sheng and Ng Chek Siong were arrested in 1998. Too was charged for murdering the Professor, and sentenced to death on 28 August 1998; he lost his appeal and was hanged in April 1999. Ng got off more lightly— he was convicted of robbing the Professor's home, and sentenced to eight years in jail, in addition to ten strokes of the cane for theft and cheating. Ng was released by October 2003 and he had returned to Malaysia since then.

Lee Chez Kee fled Singapore to Malaysia shortly after the murder. In June 2005, he was arrested by the Royal Malaysian Police for theft, and jailed. On 18 February 2006, Singapore police announced that they had extradited him back to face trial for the murder, having made arrangements with Malaysian police to extradite him upon his release from prison. He was charged in court on 19 February 2006, and sentenced to death on 10 October 2006. His appeal was dismissed on 12 May 2008 by a 2-1 majority, in a landmark judgment that clarified the doubt of admission of hearsay evidence by a dead accomplice under the Criminal Procedure Code and Evidence Act, as well as the finding of a common intention under the Penal Code. Subsequently, Lee Chez Kee was hanged on an unspecified date, sometime after the dismissal of his appeal.

References

Singaporean murder victims
People murdered in Singapore
Murder in Singapore
Malaysian people executed abroad